World for Ransom is a 1954 American film noir drama directed by Robert Aldrich and starring Dan Duryea, Patric Knowles, Gene Lockhart, Reginald Denny, and Nigel Bruce (in his final film role).

Many of the actors and sets used in the film were from the Dan Duryea television show China Smith. Aldrich and cinematographer Joseph Biroc also worked on the series.

Aldrich later said the film "first embedded what I wanted to say in films. It was mainly about two men with good and bad points. Both men believed in individual liberty but the belief of one man was weaker than the other because he had no respect for humanity."

Plot
Mike Callahan (Duryea) is an Irish émigré and war veteran working in Singapore as a private detective. He takes on a case from a former flame, now a nightclub singer. She thinks her husband Julian March (Knowles) is involved in criminal activities and asks him to help out.

Callahan learns that a man named Alexis Pederas (Lockhart) has involved Julian in a plot to kidnap a prominent nuclear scientist Sean O'Connor and hold him for ransom to the highest bidder. O'Connor is one of the only four men in the world that knows how to detonate the H-Bomb.

Cast
 Dan Duryea as Mike Callahan aka Corrigan
 Gene Lockhart as Alexis Pederas
 Patric Knowles as Julian March
 Reginald Denny as Major Ian Bone
 Nigel Bruce as Governor Sir Charles Crotts
 Marian Carr as Frenessey March
 Arthur Shields as O'Connor
 Douglass Dumbrille as Inspector McCollum
 Carmen D'Antonio as Dancer
 Keye Luke as Wong
 Clarence Lung as 	Johnny Chan
 Lou Nova as 	Guzik
 Beal Wong as 	Wu, Bartender 
 Strother Martin as Corporal
 Patrick Allen as 	Soldier
 Spencer Chan as 	Club Patron 
 Herschel Graham as Club Patron

Production background
Aldrich said he got the idea to make the film while directing episodes of China Smith. When production was on hiatus he wrote a story with a colleague. Bernard Tabakin, who produced China Smith, agreed to produce the film along with Aldrich.

Aldrich says the script was almost entirely written by Hugo Butler but Butler does not get credit due to being blacklisted. Aldrich said "There are optimists in the society, not many left, who thought that someday those guys [on the Hollywood Blacklist] would get post-mortem credits for their work. So he wrote World for Ransom and I put my name on it to try and get him the credit. And it went into arbitration with the Writer's Guild, and another guy Lindsay Hardy got total screen credit on it. It was a joke. He no more wrote that script than walk on the water. Butler made that total screenplay."

Filming started 13 April 1953 at the Motion Picture Center Studio.

The film was shot in 11 days, on a budget that has been reported between $90,000 and $100,000. It was shot over 6 days, then Aldrich halted production to shoot TV commercials in order to raise money for the film's post-production. Then there was a five-day shoot to finish it.

"It was a strange and very enjoyable experience and – except for the end result – a marvellous collaboration", said Aldrich. "It really had no sets and thanks to Joe Biroc we had reflections in the water where there was no water and all sorts of silly things. I've always looked back on World for Ransom with a kind of wistful happy feeling.."

The film is similar to another film noir with a nuclear theme by Aldrich, Kiss Me Deadly, the difference being that Callahan is trying to get an old girlfriend back, while Mike Hammer in Kiss Me Deadly was in it for the money.

Reception
The film had a considerable impact on Aldrich's career – in July 1953 Harold Hecht hired him to direct Burt Lancaster in Apache.

Critical response
When the film was released, film critic Bosley Crowther was negative about the film but appreciated the actors, writing, "Nothing gives it distinction, save possibly the people in its cast ... Robert Aldrich produced and directed. He was trying. Some day he may learn how."

More recently, film critic Dennis Schwartz was positive about the film, and wrote, "This is a marvelously understated film noir that parodies all those big-budget spy/adventure films and in my opinion does a better job than most in getting to the underbelly of that genre. Aldrich was upset with censors for lifting the scene where Duryea learns his love interest is a lesbian. He could forgive her love for other men, but not with other women. The 1950s wasn't ready for such relationships, at least not in films. Nevertheless, this was a compelling film doing a fantastic job exploring the uncertainty of partnerships and the indeterminate nature of trust."

References

External links
 
 
 
Complete film at Free Movies

1954 films
1954 drama films
Allied Artists films
American black-and-white films
American drama films
Cold War films
American detective films
1950s English-language films
Film noir
Films scored by Frank De Vol
Films directed by Robert Aldrich
Films set in Singapore
1950s American films